The 2020 Skate Canada International was scheduled to be the second event in the 2020–21 ISU Grand Prix of Figure Skating, a senior-level international invitational competition series. It would have been held at TD Place Arena in Ottawa, Ontario on October 30–31. Medals were to be awarded in the disciplines of men's singles, ladies' singles, pair skating, and ice dance.

Due to the ongoing COVID-19 pandemic, a large number of modifications were made to the Grand Prix structure. The competitors consisted only of skaters from the home country, skaters already training in the host nation, and skaters assigned to that event for geographic reasons.

On October 1, 2020, Skate Canada announced that Skate Canada International would be held without an audience present. The event was cancelled on October 14.

Entries 
The International Skating Union announced the preliminary assignments on October 1, 2020.

Changes to preliminary assignments

References 

2020 Skate Canada International
2020 in figure skating
2020 in Canadian sports
October 2020 sports events in Canada
Figure skating events cancelled due to the COVID-19 pandemic